A Little Extra Sun is the third studio recording and first EP by American independent singer Megan Slankard, released on September 6, 2005 as the follow-up to her second album, Freaky Little Story.  This was first released as a limited edition EP exclusively available at CD Baby, with limited distribution available at other music retailers in 2006.

Track listing
"My Hallelujah" (Slankard) – 3:47
"Sails" (Slankard) – 3:30
"Planets" (Slankard) – 4:16
"You Love Like" (Slankard) – 3:58
"Riley" (Slankard) – 2:58

Personnel
Megan Slankard – acoustic guitar, electric guitar, vocals
Adam Rossi – keyboards, programming
Dan Vickrey – electric guitar, acoustic guitar
Nelson Braxton – bass
Steve Bowman – drums
Brian Collier – drums

References

2005 EPs
Megan Slankard albums